FDK may refer to:

 Fortress Division Kreta, temporary designation of 164th Infantry Division (Wehrmacht), a World War II German Army unit
 Fraunhofer FDK AAC, an audio codec
 Adobe Font Development Kit for OpenType, a set of tools for editing and verifying OpenType fonts
 FDK (company), a manufacturer of batteries, majority belonging to Fujitsu 
 FDK, ICAO code for FlyDamas, a Syrian airline
 FDK, IATA code for Frederick Municipal Airport (Maryland), in the US
 "F.D.K. (Fearless Doctor Killers)", a song on the Mudhoney album My Brother the Cow
 Fdk., abbreviation for the hybrid orchid genus Fredclarkeara
 FDK, also refers to Firmware Development Kit in the Embedded System